Axer may refer to:
Aleksander Axer (1880–1948), Polish mathematician
Erwin Axer (1917–2012), Polish theatre director, writer and university professor
Axer (Transformers), a fictional character from the Transformers universe
 Axer, Italian singer and songwriter